Rollo Tomasi is an American post-hardcore band from Chicago, Illinois.

Band history 
Rollo Tomasi formed in October 1999 by Neil Sandler, Craig Olson, and Neil Keener, after Olson and Sandler's previous band, Traluma, had disbanded.  Sometimes compared to bands like Helmet and The Jesus Lizard, as well as Sandler's previous bands, Traluma and Gauge, Rollo Tomasi blend tight rhythms and aggression with a healthy nod to the early,  post hardcore bands of the mid-90s DC scene.

Their name was taken from the film L.A. Confidential, in which a police officer creates a fictional character, Rollo Tomasi, to personify all the bad guys who think “they can get away with it".

In November 2011, James Staffel of Yakuza replaced original drummer Craig Olson. In October 2013, bass player Jeff Larsen took over second guitar duties from the departing guitarist Matt Fast, and Chris LaFrombois (formerly of the Reptoids) joined the band on bass.

Members of Rollo Tomasi have been in other notable bands, including The Sky Corvair, Gauge, Yakuza, Planes Mistaken for Stars, Brokeback, Hanalei, and Treaty of Paris.

Discography

Albums

Compilation appearances
For Kenna Rae (Shakefork Records, 2011)
The World I Know - A Tribute to Pegboy (Underground Communique, 2006)
Live on WLUW 88.7 FM (2004)
Salute - A Tribute to the Fallen and the Survivors of September (Paper Crane Records, 2001)

Band members

Current Members
Neil Sandler – Vocals, Guitar (1999–present)
Jeff Larsen – Guitar, Vocals (2007–present)
Chris LaFrombois – Bass (2013–present)
James Staffel – Drums (2011–present)

Former Members
Neil Keener – Bass (1999–2000)
Craig Olson – Drums (1999–2002, 2006–2011)
Joe Partyka – Bass (2000–2002)
Pete Croke – Bass, Vocals (2002–2007)
Matt Fast – Guitar (2002–2013)
Chris Insidioso – Drums (2002–2006)

References

External links
Official website
Facebook

American post-hardcore musical groups
Rock music groups from Illinois